Frank P. Keller (February 4, 1913 – December 25, 1977) was an American film and television editor with 24 feature film credits from 1958 - 1977. He is noted for the series of films he edited with director Peter Yates, for his four nominations for the Academy Award for Best Film Editing ("Oscars"), and for the "revolutionary" car chase sequence in the film Bullitt (1968) that likely won him the editing Oscar.

Career
From 1942–1945, during the Second World War, Keller worked with editor Norval Crutcher on cataloging the film shot by combat cameramen in Europe. In 1949, Keller was editor Al Clark's assistant on All the King's Men (1949). From 1952-1956, Keller worked as an editor with Frank Capra on the first four films of The Bell Laboratory Science Series, sponsored by the American Telephone and Telegraph Company. Their work culminated with the 1956 televising (in color) of Our Mr. Sun, which was the first film of the series. Keller later edited the seventh and eighth films in the series, Thread of Life (1960) and About Time (1962), which were produced by Owen Crump for Warner Bros.

Keller's first editing credit on a feature film was for The Bonnie Parker Story (1958), which was a film noir directed by William Witney. In 1961 Keller edited Pocketful of Miracles, which was the last film directed by Frank Capra. Keller's television work included episodes from the series The Avengers (1962) and two episodes from the first season of Star Trek (1967–69). Keller is noted for editing six of the early films directed by Peter Yates, from Bullitt (1968) through Mother, Jugs & Speed (1976). His last feature film was for Rolling Thunder (directed by John Flynn-1977).

Bullitt

The car chase from Bullitt is likely the scene from Keller's work that is best remembered, and it has been extensively discussed over the years. Leonard Maltin has called it a "now-classic car chase, one of the screen's all-time best." Emanuel Levy wrote in 2003 that, "Bullitt contains one of the most exciting car chases in film history, a sequence that revolutionized Hollywood's standards. Chasing the hoodlums, McQueen drives up and down the hills of San Francisco, while an impressive hand-held camera records the perilous pursuit and traffic in thrilling minutia detail, as his sexy vehicle narrowly misses intersecting cars and trucks; other barriers during the chase are pedestrians, buildings, and so on." Paul Monaco has written, "The most compelling street footage of 1968, however, appeared in an entirely contrived sequence, with nary a hint of documentary feel about it -- the car chase through the streets of San Francisco in Bullitt, created from footage shot over nearly five weeks. Billy Fraker, the cinematographer for the film, attributed the success of the chase sequence primarily to the work of the editor, Frank P. Keller. At the time, Keller was credited with cutting the piece in such a superb manner that he made the city of San Francisco a "character" in the film."

Recognition
In 1957, Keller won an Emmy Award (Best Editing Of A Film For Television) for Our Mr. Sun. Keller was nominated for the American Cinema Editors Eddie Award for A Pocketful of Miracles (1962). He  won the Academy Award for Best Film Editing and the American Cinema Editors Eddie Award for Bullitt (1968), and was nominated for the BAFTA Award for Best Editing. He was nominated for the Academy Award and for the ACE Eddie Award for three other films: Beach Red (directed by Cornel Wilde-1967), The Hot Rock (with Fred W. Berger; directed by Peter Yates-1972), and Jonathan Livingston Seagull (with James Galloway; directed by Hall Bartlett-1973). He was nominated for ACE Eddie Awards for Room 222 (1969 - best edited TV pilot) and for Gargoyle (1972 - best edited TV special).

In 1976, Keller was elected to the Board of Governors of the Academy of Motion Picture Arts and Sciences.

Filmography
The director for each film is indicated in parenthesis.
Beyond Reason (Savalas-1985) (home media). Produced in 1977, the film was not released theatrically.
Rolling Thunder (Flynn-1977) 
Mother, Jugs & Speed (Yates-1976) 
The Daughters of Joshua Cabe Return (1975) 
For Pete's Sake (Yates-1974) 
Jonathan Livingston Seagull (Bartlett-1973) 
Gargoyles (1972) (TV Movie) 
The Hot Rock (Yates-1972) 
The Forgotten Man (1971) 
Murphy's War (Yates-1971) (edited with John Glen) 
John and Mary (Yates-1971) 
Room 222 (1969) (TV series, 1 episode) 
Bullitt (Yates-1968) 
The Ghost & Mrs. Muir (1968) (TV series, 1 episode) 
Beach Red (Wilde-1967) 
Star Trek (1966) (TV series, 2 episodes) 
Cyborg 2087 (Adreon-1966) 
Tarzan and the Valley of Gold (Day-1968) 
The Bing Crosby Show (1964) (TV series, 1 episode) 
For Those Who Think Young (Martinson-1964) 
Come Blow Your Horn (Yorkin-1963) 
Papa's Delicate Condition (Marshall-1963) 
Safe at Home! (Doniger-1962) 
About Time (1962) (TV movie) 
Pocketful of Miracles (Capra-1961) 
The Avengers (1961) (TV series) 
The Thread of Life (1960) (TV movie)
Ghost of Dragstrip Hollow (Hole-1959) 
The Five Pennies (Shavelson-1959) 
The Bonnie Parker Story (Witney-1958)

References

1913 births
1977 deaths
American film editors
Best Film Editing Academy Award winners
People from Pennsylvania
Emmy Award winners